Geraldton Sandplains is an interim Australian bioregion of Western Australia. The Geraldton Sandplains is part of the larger Southwest Australia savanna ecoregion, as assessed by the World Wildlife Fund.

Subregions

See also
 Shark Bay, Western Australia

References

Further reading
 Thackway, R and I D Cresswell (1995) An interim biogeographic regionalisation for Australia : a framework for setting priorities in the National Reserves System Cooperative Program Version 4.0 Canberra : Australian Nature Conservation Agency, Reserve Systems Unit, 1995. 

Biogeography of Western Australia
IBRA regions
Plains of Australia
Mediterranean forests, woodlands, and scrub in Australia
Southwest Australia